The white blind skink (Dibamus leucurus) is a legless lizard found in Indonesia and the Philippines.

References

Dibamus
Reptiles of Indonesia
Reptiles of the Philippines
Reptiles described in 1860
Taxa named by Pieter Bleeker